Keith Francis Cardona (born November 7, 1992) is an American professional soccer player.

Career

Youth
Cardona grew up in Glen Rock, New Jersey and played soccer at Glen Rock High School before switching to a club team.

Cardona spent time playing with the academy of New York Red Bulls, before attending the University of Maryland in 2011, where he played for two years.

While at college and briefly afterwards, Cardona appeared for NPSL side New York Red Bulls U-23.

Professional
Cardona signed for second-division Austrian side FC Liefering in July 2014. Cardona later signed with North American Soccer League side Indy Eleven in March 2015.

Career statistics

Club

References

External links
 Indy Eleven Profile.

1992 births
Living people
Glen Rock High School alumni
People from Glen Rock, New Jersey
Sportspeople from Bergen County, New Jersey
American soccer players
Maryland Terrapins men's soccer players
FC Liefering players
Indy Eleven players
Wilmington Hammerheads FC players
Association football goalkeepers
Soccer players from New Jersey
North American Soccer League players
United States men's youth international soccer players
Parade High School All-Americans (boys' soccer)